Mesterukh is a rural locality (a selo) in Akhvakhsky District, Republic of Dagestan, Russia. The population was 1,012 as of 2010.

Geography 
Mesterukh is located on the Mesterukhtlar River, 9 km southeast of Karata (the district's administrative centre) by road. Tukita is the nearest rural locality.

References 

Rural localities in Akhvakhsky District